The Vostok-L ( meaning "East"), GRAU index 8K72 was a rocket used by the Soviet Union to conduct several early tests of the Vostok spacecraft. It was derived from the Luna rocket, with a slightly enlarged second stage to accommodate the larger payload, and was a member of the Vostok family of rockets. It used the new 8K74 core instead of the 8K71 used on the original R-7 ICBM and the Luna boosters. The 8K74, first tested in December 1959, had a number of technical improvements to increase reliability and make servicing easier. Four launches were conducted between 15 May and 1 December 1960, three of which successfully reached orbit.

The first flight, on 15 May 1960, carried the Korabl'-Sputnik 1 spacecraft. The second launched on 28 July, however one of the booster engines burned through at launch, causing the booster to separate prematurely, 19 seconds after launch. The rocket broke up 30 seconds after liftoff, killing the two dogs that were aboard the spacecraft. The third flight successfully placed Korabl'-Sputnik 2 into orbit on 19 August, whilst the fourth and final flight orbited Korabl'-Sputnik 3 on 1 December. The Vostok-L was replaced by an uprated version, the Vostok-K, which offered a greater payload capacity.

References 

Vostok program
Space launch vehicles of the Soviet Union
R-7 (rocket family)